The 1947 Baylor Bears football team was an American football team that represented Baylor University in the Southwest Conference (SWC) during the 1947 college football season. 

In its first season under head coach Bob Woodruff, the team compiled a 5–5 record (1–5 against conference opponents), finished in last place in the conference, and was outscored by a total of 138 to 128. The team played its home games at Municipal Stadium in Waco, Texas. James W. Griffin was the team captain.

The 1947 season featured great backs across the Southwest Conference. Baylor lost games to SMU (No. 3 in the final AP Poll) led by halfback Doak Walker; Texas (No. 5 in the final AP Poll) led by quarterback Bobby Layne; and Rice (No. 18 in the final AP Poll) led by quarterback Tobin Rote. It won against an Arkansas team led by halfback Clyde Scott who was later inducted into the College Football Hall of Fame.

Schedule

References

Baylor
Baylor Bears football seasons
Baylor Bears football